Frank Abbott may refer to:
Frank Abbott (dentist) (1836–1897), American dentist
Frank Abbott (politician) (1828–1893), New York politician
Frank Abbott (footballer) (1885–1947), Australian rules footballer
Frank Frost Abbott (1860–1924), American classical scholar

See also
Francis Abbott (1799–1883), Australian astronomer
Francis Ellingwood Abbot (1836–1903), American philosopher and theologian